Félicien P. I. (Senne) Rouffaer (19 December 1925 – 14 July 2006) was a Flemish actor and film director. One of his most successful films as a lead actor was The Man Who Had His Hair Cut Short. On television, he was chiefly known for his leading role in the mid-1960s children's adventure series, Captain Zeppos.

Rouffaer was closely associated with the Royal Flemish Theatre in Brussels, and appeared in many of their productions. In the 1970s he also became a director.

Selected filmography

Acting 
1954: Atcha - Off-screen comment
1964-1969: Captain Zeppos (TV Series) - Jan 'Kapitein Zeppos' Stephorst
1966: The Man Who Had His Hair Cut Short - Govert Miereveld
1966: Het afscheid - Jessen, steward
1968: One Night... A Train - Elckerlyc
1968: Monsieur Hawarden - Officier
1969: Les gommes - Garinati
1972: Jonny en Jessy - Verdediger van Jonny
1977: Rubens - Generaal Spinola
1979: Woman Between Wolf and Dog - The Priest
1983: Brussels by Night - Onderzoeksrechter
1984: De schorpioen - Cutter
1985: Istanbul - Albert
1986: The van Paemel Family - Boer Van Paemel
1988: The Abyss - Le Cocq
1992: Minder dood dan de anderen - Father
1993: Seventh Heaven - Troyon
1993: Ad Fundum - Dean Schoeters
1995: The Flying Dutchman - Hennetaster
1996: Buiten De Zone (TV Series) - Peasant (uncredited)
2001: Verboden te zuchten - Dr. Louis Hanot

Directing 
1964: Captain Zeppos
1965: Johan en de Alverman

References

External links 
 
 On zeppos.hiddentigerbooks.co.uk

1925 births
2006 deaths
20th-century Flemish male actors
People from Kapellen, Belgium
Flemish male film actors
Flemish male television actors